Ketu (Sanskrit: केतु,) is the descending (i.e. 'south') lunar node in Vedic, or Hindu astrology. Personified as a deity, Rahu and Ketu are considered to be the two halves the immortal Asura (demon) Svarbhanu, who was beheaded by the god Vishnu.

As per Vedic astrology, Rahu and Ketu have an orbital cycle of 18 years and are always 180 degrees from each other orbitally (as well as in the birth charts). This coincides with the precessional orbit of moon or the ~18-year rotational cycle of the lunar ascending and descending nodes on the earth's ecliptic plane. Ketu rules the Scorpio zodiac sign together with Mangala

Astronomically, Rahu and Ketu denote the points of intersection of the paths of the Sun and the Moon as they move on the celestial sphere, and do not correspond to a physical planet. Therefore, Rahu and Ketu are respectively called the north and the south lunar nodes. Eclipses occur when the Sun and the Moon are at one of these points, giving rise to the mythical understanding that the two are being swallowed by the snake. Hence, Ketu is believed to be responsible for causing the Eclipse of the Moon.

Astrology

Since Rahu and Ketu are two opposite lunar nodes, they always appear in diametrically opposite houses (Bhāva) of horoscopes.

In Hindu astrology Ketu represents karmic collections both good and bad, spirituality and supernatural influences.  Ketu signifies the spiritual process of the refinement of materialisation to the spirit and is considered both malefic and benefic, as it causes sorrow and loss, and yet at the same time turns the individual to God. In other words, it causes material loss in order to force a more spiritual outlook in the person. Ketu is a karaka or indicator of intelligence, wisdom, non-attachment, fantasy, penetrating insight, derangement, and psychic abilities. Ketu is believed to bring prosperity to the devotee's family, removes the effects of snakebite and illness arising out of poisons. He grants good health, wealth and cattle to his devotees. Ketu is the lord of three nakshatras or lunar mansions: Ashvini, Magha and Mula.

Ketu is considered responsible for moksha, sannyasa, self-realization, gnana, a wavering nature, restlessness, the endocrine system and slender physique.

The people who come under the influence of Ketu can achieve great heights, most of them spiritual.

Rahu, being a karmic planet would show the necessity and urge to work on a specific area of life where there had been ignorance in the past life. To balance the apparent dissatisfaction one has to go that extra mile to provide a satisfactory settlement in the present lifetime. Rahu can remove all negative qualities of every planet while Ketu can emphasise every positive quality of the planet.

Ruler of Ketu: According to the most popular astrology text Brihat Parashara Hora Shastra, (BPHS) Ketu is related to Matsya.

Exaltation and Debilitation: This has been a debatable point in astrology, as per BPHS Ketu is exalted in the sign of Scorpio and debilitated in Taurus, however, many astrologers have disputed this and most modern astrologers now seem to agree that Ketu is exalted in Sagittarius and debilitated in Gemini . This stands to logic as Ketu is a torso and a prominent part of Sagittarius is a big horse torso attached to a male upper body.

Negative Significations: While Ketu is considered malefic and has been mostly associated with negative things. Most people consider it a difficult planet as it brings lot of troubles on the material plane. It often brings a sense of complete detachment, losses, mindlessness, wandering, and confusion in one's life.

Positive Significations: There is a much deeper side to Ketu and it has been called the most spiritual of all planets. Ketu has been considered the planet of enlightenment and liberation. As the one who has “lost his head (worldly senses)” Being a personification of renunciation (torso without a head who needs nothing). Ketu the ascetic that wants to go beyond the mundane life and achieve the final liberation.

Friends Planets: Ketu is a friend of Mercury, Venus, and Saturn. Jupiter is neutral in friendship. Sun, Moon, and Mars are Ketu's enemies.

Astrology and navagraha worship 

Jyotisha is Hindu astrology, which entails concept of Nakshatra (see also List of Natchathara temples), Navagraha (see also List of Navagraha temples and Saptarishi included in the list of Hindu deities whose dedicated temples are found at various Hindu pilgrimage sites to which Hindus take pilgrimage yatra.

See also 

 Navagraha
 Nakshatra
 Jyotisha
 Saptarishi
 Orbital node

References

External links

Asura
Danavas
Navagraha
Planetary deities
Sun myths
Moon myths
History of astrology
Eclipses